Dale Loves Sophie to Death (April 1981) is the debut novel of American author Robb Forman Dew. It won the 1982 National Book Award in the category First Novel.

It's a domestic story that takes places over the course of several weeks in the 1970s in Ohio and Massachusetts. The novel is notable for its realistic portrayal of children/adult relationships.

References

External links
"First Time's A Charmer: Dew's 'Dale'", Jonathan Yardley, The Washington Post, Saturday, October 25, 2008; Page C01

1981 novels
Novels set in Ohio
Novels set in Massachusetts
National Book Award-winning works
1981 debut novels